American Tower Corporation (also referred to as American Tower or ATC) is an American real estate investment trust and an owner and operator of wireless and broadcast communications infrastructure in several countries worldwide and is headquartered in Boston, Massachusetts.

It is ranked 375th on the Fortune 500 in 2022.

As of December 31, 2021, the company owned 199,330 communications sites, including 27,494 sites in the U.S. and Canada, 74,813  sites in Asia, 29,722 sites in Europe, 21,455 in Africa, and 45,816 sites in Latin America.

History
The company was formed in 1995 as a unit of American Radio Systems. In 1998, American Radio Systems merged with CBS Corporation and completed the corporate spin-off of American Tower. The first CEO of American Tower was Steven B. Dodge, remaining in the position until resigning in 2004. Following the merger, American Tower began international expansion by establishing operations in Mexico in 1998 and Brazil in 1999.

Around 2000, the company began purchasing numerous AT&T Long Lines microwave telephone relay towers. Upon acquisition of these sites from the now defunct AT&T Communications, Inc., American Tower began repurposing the towers for use as cell towers, and leasing antenna space to various American cell phone providers and private industries. Then, most of the former AT&T Long Lines sites had their horn antennas removed, either by helicopter or by crane, to make room for more antennas. Since AT&T's Long Lines Program was decommissioned in the 1980s, and the company no longer had any use for the towers themselves, American Tower now owns most of these tower structures across the entire continental United States, totalling 42,965 in 2022.

In 2004 James D. Taiclet was named CEO and held the title until 2020.

In 2005, American Tower acquired SpectraSite Communications, expanding its global portfolio to over 22,000 owned communications sites including over 21,000 wireless towers, 400 broadcast towers and 100 in-building DAS (Distributed Antenna System) sites. The merger further established American Tower's position as one of the largest tower owner and operators in North America.

Between 2007 and 2012, the company expanded internationally with operations in India, Peru, Chile, Colombia, South Africa, Ghana and Uganda.

In 2013, the company acquired Global Tower Partners for $4.8 billion. This acquisition added sites to the U.S. portfolio and added operations in Costa Rica and Panama.

In 2020, Tom Bartlett was named CEO after Taiclet left to become the CEO of Lockheed Martin.

In 2021, the company agreed to acquire the European and Latin American tower divisions of Telxius from parent company Telefonica, comprising approximately 31,000 communications sites for $9.6 billion. The acquired sites were located in Spain, Germany, Argentina, Brazil, Chile, and Peru. Later in 2021, American Tower acquired CoreSite for $10.4 billion, adding 27 data center facilities to its holdings, to position the company to become a world leader in 5G.

References

External links

Companies based in Boston
Companies listed on the New York Stock Exchange
Real estate companies established in 1995
Telecommunications companies established in 1995
Telecommunications companies of the United States
Real estate investment trusts of the United States
Mobile telecommunications